Jules Stéphane Goda (born 30 May 1989) is a Cameroonian professional footballer who plays as a goalkeeper for Régional 1 club Tours.

Career
Goda joined Ligue 2 club Ajaccio in 2016.

References

External links
 
 

1989 births
Living people
Footballers from Yaoundé
Cameroonian footballers
Association football goalkeepers
Cameroon international footballers
2017 Africa Cup of Nations players
Ligue 1 players
Ligue 2 players
Championnat National players
Olympique de Marseille players
Portimonense S.C. players
SC Bastia players
Gazélec Ajaccio players
AC Ajaccio players
Tours FC players
Cameroonian expatriate footballers
Cameroonian expatriate sportspeople in France
Expatriate footballers in France
Cameroonian expatriate sportspeople in Portugal
Expatriate footballers in Portugal